Blegny (before 2001: Blégny) is a municipality of Wallonia located in the Province of Liège, Belgium. 

On January 1, 2006, Blegny had a total population of 12,799. The total area is 26.07 km² which gives a population density of 491 inhabitants per km².

The municipality consists of the following districts: Barchon, Housse, Mortier, Saint-Remy, Saive, and Trembleur (town centre).

See also
 List of protected heritage sites in Blegny

References

External links 
 
  

Municipalities of Liège Province